Losin may refer to:
 Ko Losin (Losin Island), small rocky islet in Pattani, Thailand
 "Losin'", song by Yuna Ito

See also
 Losing (disambiguation)
 All Wikipedia pages beginning with Losin